Jordan Bruner (born December 31, 1997) is an American professional basketball player for Imortal Basket of the Liga Portuguesa de Basquetebol. He played college basketball for the Alabama Crimson Tide and the Yale Bulldogs.

Early life and high school career
Bruner was born in Oklahoma City, Oklahoma but moved to South Carolina at the age of 11. He attended Spring Valley High School, where he was coached by Perry Dozier. As a sophomore, he averaged 12 points per game. Bruner missed most of his junior season with injuries. As a senior, he averaged 16 points, 12 rebounds, 4 assists and 4 blocks per game. Bruner was a three-time All-State performer. He was regarded as a three-star prospect, ranked the second-best South Carolina player in his class by 247 Sports. Bruner committed to Yale in November 2015 over an offer from Clemson.

College career
Bruner missed the first four games of his freshman season with a knee injury and wore a brace for the rest of the year. On January 2, 2017, he scored a career-high 25 points in an 88–72 win over Hartford. He averaged 8.4 points and 5.6 rebounds per game, finishing second in the Ivy League in blocks with 55. On November 4, 2017, Bruner tore his meniscus during a scrimmage against Boston University, forcing him to miss his sophomore season. Bruner averaged 10.4 points and 8.3 rebounds per game as a junior. He helped Yale finish with a 22–8 record and reach the NCAA Tournament, where they fell to LSU 79–74. Coming into his senior season, he was the only returning starter. Bruner posted 17 points and 15 rebounds against North Carolina on December 30, 2019. On February 21, 2020, he recorded the first triple-double in Yale history with 14 points, 11 rebounds and 10 assists in an 81–80 double-overtime win against Cornell. As a senior, Bruner averaged 10.9 points, 9.2 rebounds and 3.7 assists per game and had 48 blocked shots and 29 steals. He was named to the First Team All-Ivy League. Following the season, Bruner declared for the 2020 NBA draft while maintaining his college eligibility. He ultimately transferred to Alabama for his final season of eligibility, choosing the Crimson Tide over Baylor and Maryland. Bruner suffered a knee injury against Kentucky on January 13, 2021, missing a month. He averaged 5.6 points, 3.9 rebounds, 1.2 assists and 1.2 steals per game in his only season at Alabama.

Professional career
On August 14, 2021, Bruner signed his first professional contract with Imortal Basket of the Liga Portuguesa de Basquetebol.

Career statistics

College

|-
| style="text-align:left;"| 2016–17
| style="text-align:left;"| Yale
| 25 || 0 || 22.4 || .513 || .300 || .652 || 5.6 || 1.2 || .4 || 2.2 || 8.4
|-
| style="text-align:left;"| 2017–18
| style="text-align:left;"| Yale
| style="text-align:center;" colspan="11"|  Injured
|-
| style="text-align:left;"| 2018–19
| style="text-align:left;"| Yale
| 30 || 30 || 28.0 || .511 || .278 || .734 || 8.3 || 3.0 || 1.0 || 1.5 || 10.4
|-
| style="text-align:left;"| 2019–20
| style="text-align:left;"| Yale
| 28 || 28 || 32.4 || .443 || .323 || .766 || 9.2 || 3.7 || 1.0 || 1.7 || 10.9
|-
| style="text-align:left;"| 2020–21
| style="text-align:left;"| Alabama
| 24 || 23 || 18.1 || .434 || .328 || .710 || 3.9 || 1.3 || 1.2 || .9 || 5.6
|- class="sortbottom"
| style="text-align:center;" colspan="2"| Career
| 107 || 81 || 25.6 || .477 || .309 || .716 || 6.9 || 2.4 || .9 || 1.6 || 9.0

Personal life
Bruner's sister Ashley played basketball at South Carolina and is retired from playing professionally overseas. His younger brother Tommy plays for USC Upstate.

References

External links
Alabama Crimson Tide bio
Yale Bulldogs bio

1997 births
Living people
Alabama Crimson Tide men's basketball players
American men's basketball players
Basketball players from Oklahoma
Power forwards (basketball)
Sportspeople from Oklahoma City
Yale Bulldogs men's basketball players
Basketball players from South Carolina